The Four Apostles is a panel painting by the German Renaissance master Albrecht Dürer. It was finished in 1526, and is the last of his large works. It depicts the four apostles larger-than-life-size.  The Bavarian  Elector Maximilian I obtained The Four Apostles in the year 1627 due to pressure on the Nuremberg city fathers.  Since then, the painting has been in Munich, in the Alte Pinakothek, and, despite all the efforts of Nuremberg since 1806, it has not been returned.

Description

When Dürer moved back to Nuremberg he produced many famous paintings there, including several self-portraits. He gave The Four Apostles to the town council.  Saints John and Peter appear in the left panel; the figures in the right panel are Saints Mark and Paul. Mark and Paul both hold Bibles, and John and Peter are shown reading from the opening page of John's own Gospel.  At the bottom of each panel, quotations from the Bible are inscribed.

The apostles are recognizable by their symbols:
St. John the Evangelist: open book
St. Peter: keys
St. Mark: scroll
St. Paul: sword and closed book

They are also associated with the four temperaments:
St. John: sanguine
St. Peter: phlegmatic
St. Mark: choleric
St. Paul: melancholy

Historical context
The Four Apostles was created during the Reformation, begun in 1517 and having the largest initial impact on Germany. Some Protestants believed that icons were contradictory to the Word of God, which was held in the utmost supremacy over, thus some Protestant churches would not patron any sacred art. Therefore, some Protestant artists, like Dürer became, had to commission their own works. Many aspects of the image depicted prove significant in light of the Reformation itself.  This painting has had many speculations as to the intentions, one being that it was Dürer's way of creating a sort of legacy piece by creating what he considered to be a worthy piece.

See also
Portrait of Jakob Muffel - A Dürer painting of the same year

References

External links

1526 paintings
Paintings by Albrecht Dürer
Collection of the Alte Pinakothek
Diptychs
Paintings depicting Mark the Evangelist
Paintings depicting John the Apostle
Paintings depicting Saint Peter
Paintings depicting Paul the Apostle
Lutheran art
Books in art